Madawaska County (2016 population 32,741), also known as the "New Brunswick Panhandle", is located in northwestern New Brunswick, Canada. Over 90% of the county's population speaks French. Its Francophone population are known as "Brayons." Forestry is the major industry in the county.

History 

The first inhabitants of what is now called Madawaska County were the Maliseet or Wolastoqiyik, who occupied and used the land along the Saint John River Valley north to the St. Lawrence River and south to the Penobscot River. There is debate concerning the true origin of the word "Madawaska". The earliest settlers were from Quebec. The area was the focus of the bloodless Aroostook War, a border dispute led by businessman and political activist John Baker.

Census subdivisions

Communities
There are ten municipalities within Madawaska County (listed by 2016 population):

First Nations
There is one First Nations reserve in Madawaska County (listed by 2016 population):

Parishes
The county is subdivided into fourteen parishes (listed by 2016 population):

Demographics

Language

Access routes
Highways and numbered routes that run through the county, including external routes that start or finish at the county limits:

Highways

Principal Routes

Secondary Routes:

External Routes:
 U.S. Route 1
 Quebec Autoroute 85 (TCH)
 Quebec Route 289

Protected areas and attractions

Notable people

See also

 Republic of Madawaska
 Brayon
List of communities in New Brunswick

References

 
Counties of New Brunswick